Leslie Djhone (born 18 March 1981 in Abidjan, Ivory Coast) is a French track and field athlete who competes in the 400 metres and 4 x 400 metres relay.

Djhone won the 400 metres gold medal at the 2011 European Indoor Championships and the 400 metres bronze medal at the 2006 European Championships. In the final of the 400m event, he finished 4th at the 2003 World Championships, 5th at the 2007 World Championships, 8th at the 2009 World Championships, 7th at the 2004 Olympics and 5th at the 2008 Olympics.

Djhone has also enjoyed some success in the 4x400 metres relay, the highlight being a gold medal each at the 2003 World Championships, 2011 European Indoor Championships and 2006 European Championships. He also won the bronze medal at the 2002 European Championships.

Djhone set a new national outdoor record of 44.46 seconds in the semi-finals of the 400 m event at the 2007 World Championships in Osaka, Japan.

Djhone set a new national indoor record in the 400 m with a run of 45.85 seconds at the 2010 French Athletics Championships, taking 17 hundredths of a second off Stéphane Diagana's 18-year-old mark. In 2011, he won the 400 m (in a new national indoor record time of 45.54 seconds) and the 4 × 400 m relay gold medals at the 2011 European Indoor Championships.

Personal bests
 100 metres outdoor – 10.55 s (2003)
 200 metres outdoor – 20.67 s (2004)
 400 metres outdoor – 44.46 s (2007)
 Long jump outdoor – 7.92 m (1999)
 400 metres indoor – 45.54 s (2011)

Results in international competitions
 Note: Only the position in the final is indicated

References

External links
 
 

1981 births
Living people
French male sprinters
Ivorian male sprinters
Athletes (track and field) at the 2004 Summer Olympics
Athletes (track and field) at the 2008 Summer Olympics
Olympic athletes of France
French sportspeople of Ivorian descent
World Athletics Championships medalists
European Athletics Championships medalists
Sportspeople from Abidjan
World Athletics Championships winners